Jarre Live, later re-released as Destination Docklands: The London Concert, is a live album by Jean-Michel Jarre, recorded and released in 1989 on Disques Dreyfus.  It was recorded during Jarre's Destination Docklands concerts of 1988, which consisted of two London concerts in England; this was the first time the docklands district of London and the river Thames became the scenery for a concert.

The album is a live rendering of previously released tracks by Jarre, with sometimes slightly new arrangements. Rendez-Vous IV, for instance features Hank Marvin of the Shadows on guitar. In contrast to the original concert, not all tracks are included on the live album. Équinoxe 5, for instance, was played during the show but not included on the album. Other songs, such as Industrial Revolution (or Révolution Industrielle) have been trimmed.

Track listing

 "Introduction (Révolutions)" – 1:03
 "Ouverture / Overture (Révolution Industrielle)" – 5:45
 "Industrial Revolution Part 1-2-3" – 7:49
 "Magnetic Fields II" – 4:09
 "Oxygène IV" – 3:46
 "Computer Week-End" – 5:18
 "Revolutions" – 3:52
 "London Kid" – 4:57
 "Rendez-Vous IV" – 4:16
 "Rendez-Vous II" – 8:54
 "September" – 4:45
 "The Emigrant" – 3:53

Composed, Written, Produced by Jean-Michel Jarre

The LP/Vinyl version excludes “London Kid” and “September” from the track list, but credits them in the liner notes.

Personnel
 Synthesizer, Keyboards: Jean-Michel Jarre 
 Bass – Guy Delacroix
 Choir – The Newham Academy Of Music
 Conductor (Choir) – Bruno Rossignol
 Drums – Jo Hammer
 Keyboards – Francis Rimbert
 Percussion – Dino Lumbroso
 Soprano Vocals – Christine Durand
 Synthesizer – Dominique Perrier
 Synthesizer – Michel Geiss

Additional personnel
 General Manager – Anne Slizewicz, Roger Abriol
 Production Manager (French Team) – Arnaud de La Villesbrunne
 Stage Manager – Olivier Matabon
 Promoter – Rod Gunner
 Mixed By – Denis Vanzetto, Michel Geiss
 Musical Coordinator – Sylvain Durand
 Ethnic Music Advisor – Xavier Bellenger
 Sound Engineer – Denis Vanzetto, Laurent Israel Alexandre, Mick Lanaro
 Executive-Producer – Francis Dreyfus
 Personal Assistant To J.M. Jarre – Fiona de Montaignac
 Technician – Patrick Pelamourgues

Certifications

References

Jean-Michel Jarre live albums
1989 live albums